Lee Chik-yuet (born 20 May 1954) is a Hong Kong social worker, lawyer, politician and businessman. He is the former member of the Urban Council of Hong Kong and member of the Sham Shui Po District Board.

Lee was born on 20 May 1954 in Shantou, Guangzhou and moved to Hong Kong in 1961 during the Great Famine of China. He graduated from the Shau Kei Wan Government Secondary School and attended the Chinese University of Hong Kong in 1975. He was involved in student activism at the time, including the editorial works at the student newspaper. He was under influence of Tsang Shu-ki, the prominent theorist of the "social action faction" at the time who introduced him New Left, existentialist and Frankfurt School theories.

After graduated in 1979 with a bachelor's degree in Social Science, Lee became social worker at the Hong Kong Christian Social Service, serving at Lei Cheng Uk Estate in Sham Shui Po. He first contested in the first reformed Urban Council election in 1983 alongside Frederick Fung. In 1983, he became a member of Meeting Point, the first political group to publicly support Chinese sovereignty of Hong Kong after 1997. He was re-elected to Urban Council in 1986 and did not seek re-election in 1989. He was also vice-chairman of Meeting Point under the chairmanship of Anthony Cheung. He supported Chris Patten's constitutional reform proposal which split in the party in half. In 1994, he became member of the first executive committee of the Democratic Party when the new party was founded as a merger of the United Democrats of Hong Kong and Meeting Point.

In 1990 and 1994, Lee graduated with a bachelor's degree and master's degree in laws from the University of Hong Kong respectively. He provided legal consultations to various Chinese and Hong Kong companies. He is currently an executive director of the New Ray Medicine International Holding Limited and the Town Health International Medical Group Limited.

References

1954 births
Living people
Alumni of the Chinese University of Hong Kong
Alumni of the University of Hong Kong
Hong Kong legal professionals
Hong Kong social workers
Hong Kong businesspeople
District councillors of Sham Shui Po District
Members of the Urban Council of Hong Kong
Meeting Point politicians
Democratic Party (Hong Kong) politicians